The 1906 Tulane Olive and Blue football team was an American football team that represented Tulane University as a member of the Southern Intercollegiate Athletic Association (SIAA) during the 1906 college football season. In their first year under head coach John Russ, the team compiled an overall record of 0–4–1 with a mark of 0–3 in conference play.

Schedule

References

Tulane
Tulane Green Wave football seasons
College football winless seasons
Tulane Olive and Blue football